In Hatred's Flame is the debut studio album by American thrash metal band Exmortus. It was released on July 29, 2008, on Heavy Artillery Records.

Track listing

References

2008 debut albums
Exmortus albums